Josef Johannes "Jopie" Fourie (27 August 1879 – 20 December 1914) was a Boer soldier. A scout and dispatch rider during the Boer War, he later took part in the Maritz Rebellion of 1914–1915 against General Louis Botha, the then Prime Minister of South Africa, and was executed by firing squad.

Early life
Fourie was educated at Grey College, Bloemfontein. As a schoolboy, he served under Piet Roos during the Jameson Raid. During the Second Boer War, which began in 1899, he was a scout and dispatch rider and was wounded and captured north of Pretoria during that war.

By 1914, Fourie had been commissioned into the Active Citizens Force (ACF) as an officer of the Union Defence Force.

Rebellion 
By the beginning of 1914 the high economic expectations of the unification of South Africa had been dashed. Three to four years of drought had devastated farms in parts of the Orange Free State. The government suppression of the 1913 and 1914 strikes on the Witwatersrand alienated Afrikaner workers. This created a fertile ground for rebellion. The trigger for the rebellion was Britain's declaration of war in 1914, which also put South Africa in a state of war. As a result of this, His Majesty's Government asked the South African cabinet to invade the German colony of South West Africa.

The 1914 Revolt occurred because believers in republicanism rose up against the Pro-British government of the Union of South Africa, as they did not wish to fight for the British Empire against the German Empire. Many Afrikaners had German ancestors, were veterans of the Boer Commandos, or eyewitnesses to systematic British war crimes during the Second Boer War.

Without first resigning his British commission, Fourie led a Commando which inflicted 40 per cent of the casualties of Government security forces. His commando also fired on their opponents during a brief truce. He and his brother Hannes were captured at Nooitgedacht in the district of Rustenburg on 16 December 1914.

Execution 

After the rebellion was put down by Louis Botha and Jan Smuts, the ringleaders received fines and terms of imprisonment.

The only death sentence imposed was upon Jopie Fourie. An Afrikaner delegation that included future prime minister D. F. Malan unsuccessfully petitioned Minister of Defence, Gen. Smuts, to grant leniency. Fourie was executed without a blindfold by firing squad on 20 December 1914.

Legacy 
The execution of Fourie was a divisive event in white politics. To Afrikaner believers in republicanism, Fourie was a martyr and Jan Smuts was a traitor. Fourie's court-martial and execution caused massive outrage and was a potent factor in the rise of the National Party. Fourie was one of the martyrs and legends of the Maritz Rebellion which would inspire Afrikaner nationalism long afterwards. The Jopie Fourie Primary School in Pretoria is named after him.

References

Sources

External links 

 Jopie (Josef Johannes) Fourie at sahistory.org
Jopie Fourie Primary School
 

20th-century executions by South Africa
1878 births
1914 deaths
Afrikaner nationalists
Afrikaner people
Executed South African people
People executed by firing squad
South African Army officers
South African people of Dutch descent
South African Republic military personnel of the Second Boer War